Bastien Kaltenbacher (born 20 May 1991 in Lausanne), better known as Bastian Baker, is a Swiss singer, songwriter, performer and ice hockey player. He is currently under contract with HCV Martigny of the MySports League.

He was coach in the third season of The Voice Belgique (The Voice of Belgium).

Career
Born to a professional hockey player father, Bastian wanted to become a professional hockey player in the footsteps of his father and played on Swiss National League's Juniors Elite A side "Lausanne 4 Clubs" under the name Bastien Kaltenbacher. But interested in music as well, he joined the school choir in Villeneuve, and was given solo roles. A father of a friend saw him in a performance in 2010 during a social gathering and offered to produce his songs. His first single "Lucky" produced by Richard Meyer (aka Swayd) was launched in March 2011 and charted in the Swiss Singles Chart. He took part in Caprices Festival in April 2011 and at Montreux Jazz Festival on 16 July 2011 releasing his debut album, Tomorrow May Not Be Better, on 9 September 2011. The album reached No. 3 in the Swiss album charts and topped the Romandie Charts and earned him in 2012, the "Best Breaking Act" award during Prix Walo, the official Swiss Music Awards in French language. After that success, he was invited to perform in French television's Taratata. His album Tomorrow May Not Be Better was released in France on 27 April 2012 and his single "Lucky" gained success in France as well.

From 13 October to 10 November 2012, he took part in season 3 of Danse avec les stars partnering with Katrina Patchett finishing 7th out of 10 participating stars.

Baker is the opening act for all 77 dates of Shania Twain's 2018 Now Tour and returns to the main stage to perform "Party for Two" with her during her set.

On August 20, 2020, Baker was officially signed to a one-year contract by third-tier team, HCV Martigny of the MySports League and was introduced to the media at a press conference that same day.

 Winning Danse avec les stars
 In 2012, he participated in season 3 of Danse avec les stars (the French version of Dancing with the Stars) with his partner Katrina Patchett but sadly got eliminated in week 5, finishing 7th out of 10.
This table shows the route of Bastian Baker and Katrina Patchett in Danse Avec Les Stars.
The face to face, wasn't rated.

Personal life
Bastian Baker was born to hockey player Bruno Kaltenbacher and school teacher Magali, 
and has two sisters, Margaux and Marine. Marine is also pursuing a music career as MARYNE.

Discography

Albums

Singles

Notes

A  "Lucky" did not enter the Ultratop 50, but peaked at number 26 on the Wallonia Ultratip chart, which acts as a 50-song extension to the Ultratop 50.
B  "Hallelujah" did not enter the Ultratop 50, but peaked at number 5 on the Wallonia Ultratip chart, which acts as a 50-song extension to the Ultratop 50.

References

External links
Official website

Swiss songwriters
1991 births
Living people
People from Lausanne
21st-century Swiss male  singers
MTV Europe Music Award winners